Jorge Pineda (born 20 August 1939) is a Colombian weightlifter. He competed in the men's featherweight event at the 1960 Summer Olympics.

References

External links
 

1939 births
Living people
Colombian male weightlifters
Olympic weightlifters of Colombia
Weightlifters at the 1960 Summer Olympics
People from Tunja
Sportspeople from Boyacá Department
20th-century Colombian people